The Cost of Discipleship is a book by the German theologian Dietrich Bonhoeffer, considered to be a classic of Christian thought. The original German title is simply  ("the act of following"). It is centered on an exposition of the Sermon on the Mount, in which Bonhoeffer spells out what he believes it means to follow Christ. The book was first published in 1937, when the rise of the Nazi regime was underway in Germany. It was against this background that Bonhoeffer's theology of costly discipleship developed, which ultimately led to his death.

Summary 
One of the most quoted parts of the book deals with the distinction which Bonhoeffer makes between "cheap" and "costly" grace. According to Bonhoeffer, 

Cheap grace, Bonhoeffer says, is to hear the gospel preached as follows: "Of course you have sinned, but now everything is forgiven, so you can stay as you are and enjoy the consolations of forgiveness." The main defect of such a proclamation is that it contains no demand for discipleship. In contrast to costly grace, 

Bonhoeffer argues that as Christianity spread, the Church became more "secularised", accommodating the demands of obedience to Jesus to the requirements of society. In this way, "the world was Christianised, and grace became its common property." But the hazard of this was that the gospel was cheapened, and obedience to the living Christ was gradually lost beneath formula and ritual, so that in the end, grace could literally be sold for monetary gain.

But all the time, within the church, there had been a living protest against this process: the monastic movement. This served as a "place where the older vision was kept alive." Unfortunately, "monasticism was represented as an individual achievement which the mass of the laity could not be expected to emulate"; the commandments of Jesus were limited to "a restricted group of specialists" and a double standard arose: "a maximum and a minimum standard of church obedience." This was dangerous, Bonhoeffer says, because whenever the church was accused of being too worldly, it could always point to monasticism as "the opportunity of a higher standard within the fold - and thus justify the other possibility of a lower standard for others." So the monastic movement, instead of serving as a pointer for all Christians, became a justification for the status quo.

Bonhoeffer remarks how this was rectified by Luther at the Reformation, when he brought Christianity "out of the cloister." However, he thinks that subsequent generations have again cheapened the preaching of the forgiveness of sins, and this has seriously weakened the church: "The price we are having to pay today in the shape of the collapse of the organised church is only the inevitable consequence of our policy of making grace available to all at too low a cost. We gave away the word and sacraments wholesale, we baptised, confirmed, and absolved a whole nation without condition. Our humanitarian sentiment made us give that which was holy to the scornful and unbelieving... But the call to follow Jesus in the narrow way was hardly ever heard."

Influence 
Eberhard Bethge has argued that Bonhoeffer's writings, which culminated in the Ethics and Letters and Papers from Prison, form a seamless continuity, stretching back at least as far as The Cost of Discipleship.

Unlike Bonhoeffer's later writings, The Cost of Discipleship has been widely read by both conservative and liberal Christians and is still read and quoted today.

The term "cheap grace" was coined by The Rev. Adam Clayton Powell, Sr., then-pastor of Abyssinian Baptist Church in Harlem, NY. Bonhoeffer attended the church when at Union Theological Seminary, and for a season taught Sunday School there. Bonhoeffer benefited from the protest culture of the African American church and gleaned from it social gospel elements that he would take with him back to Germany. The anti-temporal power ethic would aid him to resist the Nazi regime.

The notion of cheap grace has been used by Mike Lofgren to criticize the increasing dominance of the Christian right over the Republican Party coupled with what he saw as an increasing disregard within the party for other values:

Similarly, Katelyn Beaty of Christianity Today warned against the Christian use of cheap grace in excusing powerful men guilty of sexual assault.

References

Bibliography 
 Bethge, Eberhard. Dietrich Bonhoeffer, Man of Vision, Man of Courage. New York: Harper & Row, 1970. BX 4827.B57B43
 Bonhoeffer, Dietrich. The Cost of Discipleship. New York: Macmillan, 1966. BT 380.B66 1966
 Bonhoeffer, Dietrich, Eberhard Bethge, ed. Ethics. New York: Macmillan, 1955. BJ 1253.B615 1955a
 Bonhoeffer, Dietrich, Eberhard Bethge ed. Letters and Papers from Prison. New York: Macmillan, 1972, c1971. BX 4827.B57A43 1972a
 De Gruchy, John W. The Cambridge Companion to Dietrich Bonhoeffer. New York: Cambridge University press, 1999. BX4827.B57C36 1999
 Feil, Ernst. The Theology of Dietrich Bonhoeffer. Philadelphia: Fortress Press, 1985. BX 4827.B57F4413 1985
 Floyd, Wayne Whitson Jr., ed. Theology and the Practice of Responsibility: Essays on Dietrich Bonhoeffer. Valley Forge, PA: Trinity Press International, 1994. BX 4827.B57T47 1994
 Woelfel, James W. Bonhoeffer’s Theology: Classical and Revolutionary. Nashville: Abingdon Press, 1970. BX 4827.B57W6 1970
 Clingan, Ralph Garlin. "Against Cheap Grace in a World Come of Age." Peter Lang Publishing Co. 2002

1937 books
Christian radicalism
Christian theology books
Works by Dietrich Bonhoeffer